Mika X (born Terrance John Pou on 8 February 1962, later renamed Neil Gudsell, also known as Mika and as Mika Haka) is a New Zealand Māori singer, performance artist, actor, filmmaker, TV producer and comedian.

He has toured across the world performing his cabaret stage shows and music, including performing ten times at the Edinburgh Festival Fringe. He has also acted in TV shows and movies including Shark in the Park, The Piano, and Shortland Street. Mika has released five music albums including Do U Like What U See, Mika Haka and Mika Versus Fashion.

Name 
Mika X was named Terrance John Pou at birth, but was adopted to a family who changed his name to Neil Gudsell. In 1988, Musician Dalvanius Prime told him to change his name to the non-binary name Mika. He has since gone by Mika, Mika Haka or Mika X, and currently goes by Mika X.

Early life
Mika X was born on 8 February 1962 in Timaru, New Zealand to Elizabeth Halkett and was adopted at birth by New Zealand European couple Dawn and Bill Gudsell. He came out as gay at age 12. While attending Timaru Boys High School, he played rugby and competed in athletics, including at the national athletics championship. In 1988 Mika placed eighth in the Inaugural Suzuki World Cup aerobic championships.

After high school, Mika became a hairdresser in the small suburb of Spreydon, Christchurch; however, after winning New Zealand Flash Dance Championships he quit his job and opened up his own dance studio, Miyake Dance Studio at Peterborough Arts Centre. In 1982, Mika moved to Los Angeles with his African American Navy boyfriend for nine months before eventually returning to New Zealand. Mika moved to Christchurch in 1984 and attended New Zealand School of Dance in 1985, but left the school nine months later.

Performance career

Early stage and television work
In 1985 Mika joined Te Ohu Whakaari, a Wellington Maori theatre company which toured nationally and internationally. The next year, Mika left Te Ohu Whakaari and moved to Dunedin to work on a Te Maori exhibition.

He performed his one-man show Mahi Whakangahau in 1988. During the show Mika performed New Zealand songs, including "I Have Loved Me A Man" by Allison Durbin. The single was released by Warner Music with a music video promoting safe sex.

In 1989 he played Constable Ra in the TV drama Shark in the Park and also the young Carmen Rupe in the TV biopic Carmen. His solo show Neil Gudsell Uncooked produced by Merata Mita was performed at the 1990 Adelaide Fringe.

Stage shows I Loved me a Man, Lava Lover and Pearl Harbour 1990–1994

In 1990, the single I have loved me a man was officially released which reached 46th on the New Zealand music singles charts. The song was produced by Dalvanius Prime, the producer to Poi E.

In 1991, Mika released his first song, "Juiced", with producer Alan Jansson. He toured a show called Juiced World Tour in 1991 and 1992.

Mika played the minor role of takatāpui man Tahu in the 1993 film The Piano.

Mika performed at the 1992 Hero Party at Princes Wharf in Auckland singing his original song "Lava Lover". The performance, which began with a karanga with Mika on top of the stage, included over 300 performers: drag queens, Pacific Island dancers, lesbian taiaha, and men in semen costumes. His backdrop was Keith Haring-inspired art with yellow squares with symbols of condoms and safe sex messaging. He ended his performance with a gay haka that he created called "Tenei Toku Ure". In the following two years Mika put on four shows. Despite some setbacks when an agent stole money from him, he was the warm up act for Grace Jones at Roxy NYC.

Black Carnival, Do U like what U see? and Edinburgh 1995–1999
Mika was a model for photographer Christine Webster's photograph Mika: Kai Tahu.

In 1996, Mika released his first debut album titled Do U Like What U See. A music video was released for the title track.

Mika performed at the 1997 Edinburgh Fringe Festival. He was cast in the Rocky Horror Picture Show at the Timaru Theatre in October 1997.

In 1998, Mika collaborated with composer Gareth Farr and Mark James Hamilton on the show Ahi Ataahua. The show was first performed at Danspaleis in Wellington and then later at the 1998 Edinburgh festival. Mika collaborated with Mark James Hamilton on multiple projects over six years including The Angel Tour, Tribal Hollywood, Mika Haka, Rawaka and on TV with Mika Live and Te Mika Show.

On 1 November 1998, Mika performed on the Stonewall Equality Show 1998 at the Royal Albert Hall, and then toured internationally.

Mika Haka, Torotoro, Te Plastic Māori and return to TV 2000–2009
In 2000 Mika created a dance company, Torotoro, with Mark Hamilton and 10 young Māori and Pacific Island performers. They were the subject of a documentary, Mika Haka Kids. They performed several times at the Edinburgh Festival.

Mika's second album, Mika Haka, was released in 2001. Torotoro dancers featured in music videos for the songs "Ahi Atāahua" and "Wera Wera".

In 2004, Mika starred in his own TV variety show on Maori Television, Mika Live which first aired on 28 March. It was renamed Te Mika Show in 2006.

In 2005 Mika performed with a metal band Te Plastic Māori, including at the Montreal Fringe Festival in 2005. Their song Poti was nominated at the APRA MAIOHA awards in 2007.

Aotea Centre, Mika Versus Fashion, Rugby World Cup, Salon Mika 2010–2013
In March 2010, alongside the Auckland Philharmonia Orchestra, Mika performed at the ASB Theatre at Aotea Centre to open the Aroha Festival. The show was a gala-like event that featured performances that were in the festival and Mika performing his greatest hits including "Lava Lover" and "Do U Like What U See". Later in that year, Mika released his third album, Mika Versus Fashion. The album featured seven songs performed in Māori, English, Spanish and French, instrumentals of those songs, and a cover of "La Vie en rose". The album can be described as techno-dance and electronica.

On 23 September 2011, Mika put together the largest show of his career called Mika's Aroha Mardi Gras. As part of the 2011 Rugby World Cup that happened in New Zealand, Mika put on a free outdoor concert at the Takutai Square, Britomart, in downtown Auckland. The show had over 760 performers and it took months of rehearsals before the event took place. The show played twice on the same day with the first show going from 6 pm to 7:30 pm and second show from 8 pm to 10 pm, with thousands of people attending both times. The second show was prerecorded and broadcast on Māori TV on 14 October 2011. The event happened at the same time as Ireland v Russia and Argentina vs Scotland in the Rugby World Cup. The event featured Rena Owen as the storyteller and MC for the evening, and Mika performing his well known singles, "In the morning" (feat Keisha Castle-Hughes), Lava Lover RWC version (feat Edward Ru), "Wera Wera" (feat Erakah), Taniwha (feat Te Tai Tonga), Caged Animals (feat Kiri Nathan), Friend (feat everyone), and "Get It On" a remix of an earlier song called Spoof. In 2012, Mika assumed the role as Chair person for the non-profit organisation, "Ngā Aho Whakaari". Ngā Aho Whakaari is a not-for-profit Incorporated Society that represents Māori who work in the New Zealand screen industry. Mika ended his role in 2013. In 2013, Auckland had its own Fringe Festival. Mika did a season of cabaret shows with a live band and special guest including Megan Alatini at one of Auckland's busiest nightclubs "Switch Bar". The show was called "Salon Mika". Mika went on to perform eight shows during the festival, to a sell-out crowd. With the success of Salon Mika, he decided to take the cabaret show on tour across the world.

Dress to Express, Coffee, Loved Me a Man 2014–2016
On Waitangi Day 2014, Mika put together a small variety show at one of Auckland's nightclubs. At the end of the event, Mika performed his new single "Dress to Express" featuring Zakk d'Larté and Hannah Martin. The single produced a music video with all three dancing and singing the song with special effects. The single reached the top 40s on the iTunes New Zealand Charts. The success of the song led to releasing another single later in the year. This time releasing the remixed version of "Coffee" Featuring Lavina Williams. The single also produced a music video that featured well known LGBT members of the community. On 1 May 2016, Mika put on a one-day festival similar to the 2011 Mika Aroha Mardi Gras closing down Karangahape Road to perform on the street. The event was called "Mika Aroha Mardi Gras The Red Light District". The event lasted for over seven hours with people flooding the street to attend the event. The event featured Mr Gay World 2013 and New Zealand's Got Talent semi finalist Christopher Olwage, Queens Of Panguru (Ramon Te Wake, Jay Tewake and Maihi Makiha), a music performance from Mika himself and many more performances. At the festival, some of Queens of Panguru TV series was filmed for the first episode.

On 9 July 2016, New Zealand celebrated the 30 year anniversary of Homosexual Law Reform Act 1986. An event was held at the Skycity Convention Centre called the Rainbow Gala, to celebrate the anniversary. Mika Haka opened the event with a branded new song, a remixed version of "Loved Me a Man" featuring Lavina Williams. The music video of the song was released in October 2016. The video showed some of Mika's past performances in music, video and art. It shows Mika singing in a night club in an intimate setting and seeing Mika as a gay Maori Jesus-like character.

Queens of Panguru, Swimming with Sharks, Salon Mika Live 2017–2019
Throughout 2016 and 2017, the filming and editing of Queens of Panguru was in production. Mika was the creator, creative designer and executive producer of the TV series. Some of Mika's music also featured in the TV series. The show was televised weekly on Māori Television, with the premiere on 22 March 2017.

In February 2017, Mika released his fourth album, Swimming with Sharks. The album featured dance and electronic versions of his original music including "Swimming with Sharks", "Taniwha" and "In the Morning" which featured Keisha Castle-Hughes. Mika also featured in Costa Kerdemelidis' song "Tango on a Tightrope" from Kermelidis' 2017 album The Big Shake.

In October 2017, Mika put together a charity concert to raise money and supplies for the Auckland City Mission to give to the homeless in Auckland City. In August 2018, Mika released a Live Album from his Salon Mika caberate show that he performed at the Edinburgh fringe festival. In June 2019, Mika returned to his hometown of Timaru and accepted 2018 Teschemaker Cup for his contribution to demonstrating outstanding achievement in his chosen field of performing arts at his high school, Timaru Boys' High School. On 10 September 2019, it was announced that Mika was cast as Ngati Haua entertainer for "Natives Go Wild" show at the Sydney Opera House. He will perform in seven shows between 22 and 27 October.

Aroha Collective and rereleased music
On 10 April 2020, Mika released his fifth album "The Aroha Collective". The album was originally scheduled to be released on New Zealand's version of Anti-Bullying Day, "Pink Shirt Day" on May 18, but due to the COVID-19 pandemic in New Zealand Mika released the album early to give provide content during lockdown. The album was a collaboration album sung in Te Reo featuring artists including Lavina Williams, King Homeboy, Yorke and Te Amo. On July 13, Mika rereleased his album "Mika Haka" for Matariki and the 20th anniversary since the original release.

GURL 

Mika directed, wrote, produced, and played the lead role in the short film GURL about the life of drag queen Carmen Rupe. Production began in 2019 and the 20-minute film premiered at the 2020 New Zealand International Film Festival as part of a collection of Māori and Pasifika short films. Mika played Carmen; the film also featured Jay Tewake, Jackie Clarke and Brady Peeti. Mika also wrote the album soundtrack to the movie which released on 24 July 2020.

Conviction for attempting to dissuade a witness
In April 2017, Mika X met with a sexual assault victim who wanted to get into the entertainment industry. Mika offered to pay the victim $15,000 to drop the charges against a businessman who had assaulted them in October 2016. Mika would also offer the victim work in the Gold Coast.

In April 2018, Mika was charged for attempting to pervert the course of justice. He got temporary name suppression while on trial. The trial was originally scheduled in June 2020, but due to Covid-19 it was postponed. In February 2021, Mika pleaded guilty on two counts of attempting to pervert the course of justice, and on 30 March 2021, he was sentenced to 11 months of home detention. The businessman was found guilty for three counts of indecent assault and two counts of attempting to pervert the course of justice and was jailed for two years and four months, however his name has not yet been revealed. In August 2021, he was granted bail while he challenged his conviction in the Court of Appeal.

Politics
Mika stood for The Opportunities Party in Auckland Central at the 2017 New Zealand general election, and was ranked tenth on TOP's party list. He came fourth in the electorate, with 681 votes, and did not enter Parliament.

Discography

Singles
I Have Loved Me a Man (1990) NZ Single charts #46
Juiced (1991)
Lava Lover (1992)
Do U Like What U See? (1996)
My Angel (2000)
Ahi Ataahua (2001)
Werawera (2001)
Poti with Te Plastic Maori (2007)
The Closer I Get to You feat. Mirrah (2008)
Dress to Express feat. Zakk d'Larté and Hannah Martin (2014)
Coffee feat. Lavina Williams (2014)
Loved Me a Man feat. Lavina Williams (2016)

EPs
 Juiced (1992)

Albums
Do U Like What U See (1996)
Mika Haka (2001, rereleased in 2020)
Mika Versus Fashion (2010)
The Aroha Collective (2020)
Gurl The Movie soundtrack (2020)

Remix album
Swimming with Sharks (2017)

Live albums
Kapai Kabaret (1996)
Salon Mika Live in Edinburgh (2018)

Other appearances

Notable performances and tours

Filmography

Awards

References

Further reading
 Mazer, Sharon. I Have Loved Me A Man The Life & Times Of Mika, Creative Live Series, 2018 

Gay singers
New Zealand gay actors
LGBT dancers
New Zealand LGBT musicians
New Zealand Māori male singers
New Zealand male film actors
New Zealand male television actors
People from Auckland
People from Timaru
The Opportunities Party politicians
Unsuccessful candidates in the 2017 New Zealand general election
20th-century New Zealand LGBT people
21st-century New Zealand LGBT people
New Zealand LGBT singers
20th-century New Zealand male singers
21st-century New Zealand male singers
New Zealand dancers
Non-binary artists
Non-binary comedians